Louis Eugène Roy (1861 – 27 October 1939) was a prominent mulatto Haitian banker selected by U.S. General John H. Russell, Jr., the American High Commissioner to Haïti, to serve as that country's interim president following the resignation of Louis Borno. Roy served from 15 May to 18 November 1930, during which time his major duty was to oversee elections to the new National Assembly. When the Assembly selected Sténio Vincent as president, Roy stepped down.

References

1861 births
1939 deaths
Haitian people of Mulatto descent
Haitian bankers
Presidents of Haiti